A leap year starting on Friday is any year with 366 days (i.e. it includes 29 February) that begins on Friday 1 January and ends on Saturday 31 December. Its dominical letters hence are CB. The most recent year of such kind was 2016 and the next one will be 2044 in the Gregorian calendar or, likewise, 2000 and 2028 in the obsolete Julian calendar.

Any leap year that starts on Tuesday, Friday or Saturday has only one Friday the 13th: the only one in this leap year occurs in May. Common years starting on Saturday share this characteristic.

In this leap year, Martin Luther King Jr. Day is on January 18, Valentine’s Day is on a Sunday, Presidents Day is on its earliest possible date, February 15, the leap day is on a Monday, St. Patrick’s Day and Cinco De Mayo is on a Thursday, Memorial Day is on May 30, Juneteenth is on a Sunday, U.S. Independence Day is on a Monday, Labor Day is on September 5, Halloween is on a Monday, Thanksgiving is on November 24, and Christmas is on a Sunday. Additionally, this type of year is the only year that Presidents Day does not fall on the penultimate Monday of February.

In this type of year, all dates (except 29 February) fall on their respective weekdays 58 times in the 400 year Gregorian calendar cycle. Leap years starting on Sunday share this characteristic.

Calendars

Applicable years

Gregorian Calendar 
Leap years that begin on Friday, along with those that start on Sunday, occur most frequently: 15 out of the 97 (≈ 15.46%) total leap years in a 400-year cycle of the Gregorian calendar. Thus, the overall occurrence is 3.75% (15 out of 400).

400 year cycle

century 1:  16, 44, 72

century 2:  112, 140, 168, 196

century 3:  208, 236, 264, 292

century 4:  304, 332, 360, 388

Julian Calendar 
Like all leap year types, the one starting with 1 January on a Friday occurs exactly once in a 28-year cycle in the Julian calendar, i.e. in 3.57% of years. As the Julian calendar repeats after 28 years that means it will also repeat after 700 years, i.e. 25 cycles. The year's position in the cycle is given by the formula ((year + 8) mod 28) + 1).

References 

Gregorian calendar
Julian calendar
Friday